Te Hana Hudson (previously Kahu) is a fictional character on the New Zealand soap opera Shortland Street who was portrayed by Vanessa Rare for two stints from 2001 to 2005. The matriarch of the Hudson family unit, Te Hana was introduced during an infamous revamp of the show and was a representation of the working class New Zealander.

Creation and casting
In 2000 an Australian consultant made several large changes to the show that would see a more working class hospital portrayed. Te Hana, her husband Joe and children Mihi and Tama were created because of this. As part of the revamp, producers wished for a more community based cast with established family links, mimicking the past presence of the Warner and McKenna families. The Hudson's arrival was said to be a "shock" for the established character of Te Hana's brother, Victor Kahu (Calvin Tuteao). Vanessa Rare was cast in the role. Rare left the role in 2003 but returned in several sporadic stints. She returned for several episodes in a guest role in 2003 and returned the following year for several months before departing on 28 January 2005. She returned in 2006 for another guest stint as part of on screen son David Wikaira-Paul's departure.

Storylines
Te Hana arrived with her family for a fresh start but she grew annoyed at her brother Victor's (Calvin Tuteao) attempts to break up her marriage to Joe Hudson (Rawiri Paratene). Te Hana developed a crush on Geoff Greenlaw (Andrew Laing) and the two eventually kissed, only to be caught by Te Hana's daughter Mihi (Quantrelle King) who told Joe, ending the marriage. It seemed Te Hana and Joe were heading for reconciliation but he ended up leaving the country and Te Hana and Geoff got together. Te Hana realized Geoff had killed a patient and took the blame, suffering a demotion. She was delighted to welcome her foster daughter Shannon (Amber Curreen) back into her life but discovered she was pregnant to her teenage son Tama Hudson (David Wikaira-Paul). Te Hana's demotion continued to drive her away from Geoff and the two broke up before Te Hana left Ferndale to be closer to Mihi. She made a brief return later in the year and was shocked to learn Geoff was in fact gay.

Te Hana returned to support Victor following his arrest for the murder of Geoff. She began to date Bronson Paraone (Kirk Torrance) but was disgusted to learn Tama was marrying Shannon. Despite initially deciding to boycott the ceremony, Te Hana gave her blessing to Shannon and attended. Te Hana decided to take a brief break with Bronson to visit the family marae, however she ended up not returning. Te Hana returned a year later to support Tama and his custody battle against Shannon for their daughter Rangimarie (Mia Curreen-Poko). She abused Shannon physically and left having admitted defeat to her daughter in law.

Character development
Upon arrival Te Hana was described as; "a strong Maori woman" and was "fiercely ambitious for her kids". The move to the city proved positive for Te Hana, as she was "determined to get ahead now that she and her family have made a fresh start in the city". Te Hana was also said to be "on a mission to achieve success for herself and her family on her own terms." Producer Simon Bennett described the family, stating "The Hudson family is poor. They’ve moved to the city from the country and they’re trying to start a new life with nothing".

Reception
Producer Simon Bennett did not enjoy the introduction of the Hudson family, stating: "With the best will in the world the intention to introduce a down on their luck Maori family who moved from the country to the city came across as mawkish and somewhat PC in flavour." The inclusion of the Hudson family did however bring on a more appropriately balanced amount of Māori culture into the soap both on and offscreen. The Hudson "era" has since been identified as the peak of Māori inclusion in the show. It was also said to introduce a large Māori audience and help accurately define the race demographics.

References

Shortland Street characters
Television characters introduced in 2001
Fictional Māori people
Female characters in television
Fictional nurses